Fadihah (also Romanized as Fadīhah, Fadiha, and Fadīheh; also known as Fadīmeh and Pia) is a village in Bayg Rural District, Bayg District, Torbat-e Heydarieh County, Razavi Khorasan Province, Iran. At the 2006 census, its population was 380, in 122 families.

References 

Populated places in Torbat-e Heydarieh County